Ptah is a god in Egyptian mythology.

Ptah may also refer to:

 5011 Ptah, a near-Earth asteroid discovered in 1960
 Ptah-Du-Auu, an Egyptian priest who lived during his kingdom's 4th dynasty 
 Ptahil, creator of the material universe in Mandaeism
 Ptahil (album), an album released by Atrium Carceri
 Ptah, the El Daoud, an album created by Alice Coltrane
 P'Taah, one of the aliases of musician Chris Brann
 PTAH, a French post-rock musician